Anateinoma is a monotypic moth genus of the family Noctuidae. Its only species, Anateinoma affabilis, is found in Puerto Rico and the Virgin Islands. Both the genus and species were first described by Heinrich Benno Möschler in 1890.

References

Acontiinae
Noctuoidea genera
Monotypic moth genera